Lars Ljungqvist (born May 12, 1959) is a Swedish economist probably best known as the author of Recursive Macroeconomic Theory, a standard graduate level textbook of modern macroeconomics, with Thomas J. Sargent.

Ljungqvist is a macro economist with seminal papers on labour: European unemployment, wage structures, information asymmetries and international trade. He held teaching positions at SUNY and was senior economist at Fed Reserve Bank of Chicago. 

He is seasonal visiting professor at New York University where he lectures the macro PhD and MBA courses at Stern, and permanent Professor at Stockholm School of Economics.

Selected publications

References

External links
CV at New York University
MIT Press's page for Recursive Macroeconomic Theory

1959 births
Living people
Swedish economists
New classical economists
Stockholm School of Economics alumni
University of Minnesota alumni
New York University faculty
Academic staff of the Stockholm School of Economics